Flederman was an Australian contemporary music ensemble co-founded by Carl Vine and Simone de Haan in 1978. Both were teaching at Queensland Conservatorium of Music, Brisbane. It later became an ensemble with a fluctuating line-up and up to six members at a time. They released their debut album, Australian Music, in 1984. In 1988 Flederman issued their self-titled second album, which won the ARIA Award for Best Classical Album was nominated for Best Independent Release in 1989.

History 

Flederman were founded in 1978 at Queensland Conservatorium of Music, Brisbane as a contemporary music duo by teachers Simone de Haan on trombone and electronics and Carl Vine on piano and electronics. In March 1979 they performed, "works by Cage, Johnson, Berio and others" at Cellblock Theatre, East Sydney Technical College. By 1982 it had developed into an ensemble by adding Graeme Leak on percussion and auxiliary members Hector McDonald on horn and Daniel
Mendelow on trumpet. For their North American tour, in January of the following year, de Haan, Leak and Vine were joined by Geoffrey Collins on flute.

In 1984 they issued their album, Australian Music, the five tracks were composed by Vine, Keith Humble, Martin Wesley-Smith, Robert Douglas and Graham Hair, respectively. It was issued via Larrikin Records and recorded at Recording Hall, Sydney Opera House with the line-up of Collins, Leak, Vine joined by Hair on keyboards, Brett Kelly on trombone and Georg Pedersen on cello. In 1986 the line-up of Collins, Kelly and Vine were joined by Michael Askill on percussion, David Miller on piano and David Pereira on cello. They recorded a four-track self-titled album at Broadwalk Studio, Sydney Opera House, which was issued in 1988 via MBS Records. The tracks were written by Hair, Wesley-Smith, Roger Smalley and Vine, respectively. At the ARIA Music Awards of 1989 they won Best Classical Album and were nominated for Best Independent Release.

Members

 Simone de Haan – trombone, electronics
 Carl Vine – piano, electronics, keyboards
 Graeme Leak – percussion
 Geoffrey Collins – flute
 Graham Hair – keyboards
 Brett Kelly – trombone
 Georg Pedersen – cello
 Michael Askill – percussion
 David Miller – piano
 David Pereira – cello

Discography

Albums

Awards and nominations

ARIA Music Awards

The ARIA Music Awards are a set of annual ceremonies presented by Australian Recording Industry Association (ARIA), which recognise excellence, innovation, and achievement across all genres of the music of Australia. They commenced in 1987.

! 
|-
|rowspan="2"| 1989
|rowspan="2"| Flederman
| ARIA Award for Best Independent Release
| 
| 
|-
| ARIA Award for Best Classical Album
| 
|

References

ARIA Award winners
Australian classical music groups